Mohammed Farid Bakhati (date of birth and death unknowns) was an Egyptian football midfielder who played for Egypt in the 1934 FIFA World Cup. He also played for Zamalek SC.

References

Egyptian footballers
Egypt international footballers
Association football midfielders
Zamalek SC players
1934 FIFA World Cup players
Year of birth missing